Colours is a compilation album from Scottish singer-songwriter Donovan. It was released in the United Kingdom (Hallmark Records HMA 241) in June 1972 and did not chart.

History
In 1971, Donovan's 1965 Pye Records recordings were sold to Hallmark Records.  Although Pye subsidiary Golden Hour Records released Golden Hour of Donovan the year before, Hallmark assembled two albums from the recordings.  The first album, titled Catch the Wind, was named after Donovan's first single but bore little resemblance to the U.S. album of the same name.  The second album, titled Colours after Donovan's second single, marked the first time the song title was used for an album title.

Track listing
All tracks by Donovan Leitch, except where noted.

Side one
"Colours"
"To Sing for You"
"Car Car" (Woody Guthrie)
"Ballad of Geraldine"
"Keep on Truckin'" (traditional, arranged by Donovan Leitch)

Side two
"Josie"
"Donna Donna" (Aaron Zeitlin, Sholom Secunda, Arthur S Kevess, Teddi Schwartz)
"The War Drags On" (Mick Softley)
"Hey Gyp (Dig the Slowness)"
"Tangerine Puppet"

Personnel 

Donovan – guitar, harmonica, vocals

References

External links
 Colours (1972) – Donovan Unofficial Site

1972 compilation albums
Donovan compilation albums